Daniel Harford (born 19 March 1977) is the former senior coach of the Carlton Football Club in the AFL Women's league and a former Australian rules footballer who played for the Hawthorn Football Club and Carlton Football Club in the Australian Football League. He is also radio presenter and commentator.

AFL career
Originally from Parade College, Harford was a Teal Cup captain of Victoria as a youngster. He played junior football for St Mary's in the DVFL, and was recruited from the Northern U18 team by the Hawthorn Football Club with the 8th overall selection in the 1994 AFL Draft. While at Hawthorn, where he made his debut in 1995, he was a hard-at-the-ball midfielder or occasionally, small forward. He also made regular appearances on The Footy Show during this period.

In 2002 Harford managed just 11 games, suffering a run of injuries, and continued to struggle for form and fitness in 2003 where he played only another 5 games. Although Harford was on a long-term contract, Hawthorn decided to try to offload him, and at the end of the year Carlton contracted traded pick no 51 for him, with Hawthorn paying half his contract. During a pre-season run in October 2004 Harford decided to retire from AFL football.

Post-AFL playing career 
Harford played VAFA football for Old Paradians in 2005, and returned to the VFL to play for the Northern Bullants, with whom he had previously played while on the Carlton list. He was consistently one of the best in the Bullants' minor premiership team, winning the Laurie Hill Trophy as the Bullants' best and fairest, and finishing third in the J. J. Liston Trophy count.

In 2007, Harford moved to the Balwyn Football Club in the Eastern Football League. He played there in 2007, served as playing-coach in 2008 (winning the premiership that season), and retired from playing at the end of 2008. He continued to serve as non-playing coach at Balwyn until 2011, then as coach at St Kevin's Old Boys in the Victorian Amateur Football Association in 2012, where he still coaches as of 2013.

Coaching career
After serving as an assistant coach with  during the 2018 AFL Women's season, he was appointed the senior coach of 's AFLW team in April 2018 for the 2019 season onward. In January 2023 Harford was sacked as senior coach after a comprehensive review into the Carlton AFLW Program following a drastic decline in on-field performances.

Media career
Harford, known as a bit of a joker during his playing days, joined fledgling Melbourne sports radio network SEN 1116 in 2005 as a presenter, after his retirement from the AFL and while he was playing in the VAFA. He began by hosting a Sunday afternoon sports show with Robert Shaw, in 2006 he hosted On the Rise, a morning weekend program, with Jason Richardson. He made regular appearances on "The Good Oil", a weekday 12-4 afternoon show, between 2007 and 2009, before taking over the timeslot in 2010 with his own program Harf Time, this ran until 2016, when he moved to the Drive program. He has also been involved in the network's VFL (in 2006) and AFL (since 2007) commentary teams.

In 2007, he hosted a car show on Channel 9, "Test Drive."

In November 2016, Harford resigned from 1116 SEN and will move to RSN 927 to host breakfast.

Personal life
He is married to Rebecca and they have a daughter, Abbey and a son, William.

References

External links 

1977 births
Living people
Carlton Football Club players
Hawthorn Football Club players
Preston Football Club (VFA) players
Northern Knights players
Old Paradians Amateur Football Club players
Australian rules footballers from Victoria (Australia)
Victorian State of Origin players